Mirzazade — surname.

Aydin Mirzazade — is a deputy in the National Assembly of Azerbaijan.
Boyukagha Mirzazade — was a prominent Azerbaijani artist, named People's Artist of the Azerbaijan SSR in 1967.
Khayyam Mirzazade — is an Azerbaijani composer and professor. 

Surnames